Drone Logic is the debut studio album by English electronic musician Daniel Avery. It was released on 7 October 2013 under Phantasy Sound and Because Music.

Accolades

Critical reception
Drone Logic was met with universal acclaim from critics. At Metacritic, which assigns a weighted average rating out of 100 to reviews from mainstream publications, this release received an average score of 83, based on 11 reviews.

Track listing

Charts

References

2013 debut albums
Daniel Avery (musician) albums
Phantasy (record label) albums